WUPT-CA (analog channel 25) was a low-power, Class A television station licensed to Crystal Falls, Michigan, United States, which served the western Upper Peninsula of Michigan as an affiliate of UPN. The station was owned by Western Upper Peninsula Television.

WUPT-CA also had a translator in Republic with the callsign WUPT-LP, broadcasting on analog channel 43.

History 

The station was founded on January 18, 1980, and began broadcasting on December 10 of that same year. It granted Class A status on March 8, 2001, and moved to channel 25 in October of that year. The station became a UPN affiliate when the network launched on January 16, 1995. The station removed UPN programming in January 2000, while carrying the Outdoor Channel until March 1 when it switched to AIN. UPN programming returned to the station in January 2001, while later switching to America One in September of that year.

When WUPT moved its UPN affiliation to Fox affiliate WMQF (as a secondary affiliation) on May 9, 2003, it switched to UATV and signed off in July. The Federal Communications Commission (FCC) canceled the station's license on October 27, 2003.

External links
Screengrabs from the late WUPT
Michiguide: WUPT

UPT-CA
Defunct television stations in the United States
UPT-CA
Television channels and stations established in 1980
1980 establishments in Michigan
Television channels and stations disestablished in 2003
2003 disestablishments in Michigan